Protein CLN8 is a protein that in humans is encoded by the CLN8 gene.

Molecular biology

This gene encodes a transmembrane protein that localizes to the endoplasmic reticulum (ER) and recycles between the ER and the Golgi apparatus via COPII- and COPI-coated vesicles. CLN8 protein functions as a cargo receptor for lysosomal soluble proteins in the ER. CLN8 proteins pair with CLN6 proteins to form the EGRESS complex (ER-to-Golgi relaying of enzymes of the lysosomal system), the functional unit responsible for the export of lysosomal enzymes from the endoplasmic reticulum.

Clinical

Mutations in this gene are associated with progressive epilepsy with mental retardation (EPMR), a subtype of neuronal ceroid lipofuscinosis (NCL). Patients with mutations in this gene have altered levels of sphingolipid and phospholipids in the brain.

References

External links
  GeneReviews/NIH/NCBI/UW entry on Neuronal Ceroid-Lipofuscinoses

Further reading